The 12th Pan American Games were held in Mar del Plata, Argentina from March 11 to March 26, 1995.

Medals

Silver

Bronze

Men's Flyweight (– 54 kg): Orlando Vásquez

Results by event

See also
Nicaragua at the 1996 Summer Olympics

Nations at the 1995 Pan American Games
P
1995